The Diocese of Botswana is one of 15 dioceses of the Anglican Church of the Province of Central Africa, a province of the Anglican Communion. It is a member of the Botswana Council of Churches.

List of Bishops of Botswana

 1972–1978: C. Shannon Mallory
 1979–2000: Walter Khotso Makhulu, also Archbishop of Central Africa from 1980 to 2000
 2000–200?: Theo Naledi
 2005–2013: Trevor Mwamba
 2013-    : Metlhayotlhe Beleme

References

External links
Diocesan website

Anglicanism in Botswana
 
Botswana